Lućmierz  is a settlement in the administrative district of Gmina Zgierz, within Zgierz County, Łódź Voivodeship, in central Poland.

References

Villages in Zgierz County